The Executioner ( is a 1975 South Korean film directed by Byun Jang-ho, later remade as I Will Survive.

Plot 
An executioner and his family try to survive from the dead.

Remake 
The newer film I Will Survive is based on the film, although there is a difference when a main character rapes the daughter of noble man whom he had executed and saves her from jail.

Cast 
 Baek Il-seob
 Park Ji-yeong
 Heo Jang-kang
 Kim Mu-yeong
 Kim Nan-yeong

External links 
 
 

1975 films
1970s Korean-language films
South Korean drama films
Films set in the Joseon dynasty
Films directed by Byun Jang-ho